The Golden Mic Awards (Chinese: 金唛奖; previously known as Singapore Radio Awards) is an accolade by Singapore's MediaCorp to recognize excellence of presenters and producers in MediaCorp Radio. Although the moniker Singapore may suggest a representation of all radio stations in Singapore, the nominations are only open to MediaCorp Radio stations.

History
Prior to the Singapore Radio Awards (SRA), the three Chinese radio stations (Y.E.S. 93.3FM, Capital 95.8FM and Love 97.2FM) under MediaCorp held their own Golden Mike Awards (GMA). The last GMA was held in 2004 and the SRA was born a few months later to encompass stations from all four languages that MediaCorp broadcast in: English, Chinese, Malay and Tamil.

The first SRA was held in 2005, and was renamed MediaCorp Radio Awards (MRA) in 2013.

Ceremony
The first Singapore Radio Awards ceremony was held in 2004 at Raffles City Convention Centre. It was a trade event, whereby clients of MediaCorp were invited for a formal sit-down dinner. Listeners were not invited to the show. 

The second SRA was held in 2005 in Shangri La Hotel's Island Ballroom. The third SRA was held at the same location in 2006. Similarly, only trade clients were invited. 

The fourth SRA, in 2007, was held at Suntec Convention Centre. For the first time, listeners were invited to purchase tickets to attend. All nominees were involved in the opening sequence. 

The SRA was not held in 2008 and 2009. 

Singapore Radio Awards 2010 was held in MediaCorp's TV Theatre, with a live webcast on its official site. Florence Lian, former radio DJ and Singapore Idol judge, currently MediaCorp's Managing Director for Radio, opened the show with a monologue. The hosts were Vernon A and Justin Ang from 987FM. Award presenters included Irene Ang, Bobby Tonelli, as well as MediaCorp's senior management. 987FM were the biggest winners for the night, sweeping "Best Radio Show", "Most Creative English Trailer", and "Best Radio Personality Blog".

Singapore Radio Awards 2011 was telecast live on Channel 5. 

MediaCorp Radio Awards 2013 was to be held on 15 November. The show was to be telecast live on Channel 5.

Nomination
All weekday presenters were automatically nominated for the "Most Popular DJ" Award for the respective stations. The results are based on SMS polling.

Nominees for other awards were selected by a panel of professionals in the industry.

Awards

Best Radio Show

Radio Personality of the Year (Media's Choice)

English Stations Most Popular DJ

Chinese Stations Most Popular DJ

Lifetime Achievement Award

Award categories

Current categories

Sponsored categories

Suspended/retired categories

References

Radio awards
Radio in Singapore